HMS Montford was one of 23 boats of the  of patrol boats built for the Royal Navy in the 1950s.

Their names were all chosen from villages ending in -ford. This boat was named after Montford, Shropshire. She was launched on 10 October 1957 and sold to Nigeria on 9 September 1957. Renamed NNS Ibadan, she was captured at the declaration of independence of Biafra by independentists in Calabar. She saw action as BNS Vigilance during Nigerian Civil War and was sunk on 9 October 1967 at Port Harcourt.

References

Ford-class seaward defence boats
Royal Navy ship names
1957 ships
Nigerian Navy
Nigerian Civil War
Patrol vessels of the Nigerian Navy